James Edward Collins (born 28 September 1984) is an English semi-professional footballer who plays as a defender. He is currently manager of Havant & Waterlooville. Collins captained Sutton United in 2016-17 when they reached the 5th round of the FA Cup for the first time ever.

Career
Collins began his youth career as a scholar at Watford, signing a professional contract with the club in June 2004. However, he failed to impress and was released the following February. Collins joined Havant & Waterlooville for the rest of the season, quickly impressing the fans and signing a full contract with the club in May 2005. Collins went on to play four seasons with The Hawks, becoming a first team regular and being rewarded with the captaincy for the 2007–08 season. In his first season as captain, Havant made a memorable run in the FA Cup, knocking out Football League sides Notts County and Swansea City to earn a fourth round tie away at Liverpool, in which they twice took the lead before losing 5–2.

After a disappointing 2008–09 campaign, Collins joined division rivals Hampton & Richmond Borough for an undisclosed fee. He spent just three months at the club before being signed by Newport County manager Dean Holdsworth, where he went on to be a key player in the 2009–10 season, as Newport won the Conference South title with a record 103 points.

In January 2011 Holdsworth became manager of League Two side Aldershot Town, and Collins followed his former boss five months later, signing on a free transfer at the end of the 2010–11 season.

On January transfer window deadline day on 31 January 2012, Collins signed for Forest Green Rovers on an 18-month contract for an undisclosed fee. Collins made his Forest Green debut on 18 February 2012 in a home win against Gateshead. In July 2012, Collins signed an extension to his contract at Forest Green which would see him stay at The New Lawn until the end of the 2013–14 season.

In May 2013, Collins and Forest Green agreed to the mutual termination of his contract and he moved to Eastleigh.

After being released by Eastleigh, Collins signed for Sutton United at the start of 2015, making 19 league appearances in the second half of the 2014–15 season and scoring his first goal for the club in a 2–1 victory against Basingstoke Town on 11 April 2015. Collins was appointed captain for the 2015–16 season, making 29 full and two substitute league appearances for the U's and scoring a further five goals, leading them to winning the National League South title. He was named in the National League South team of the season.

Remaining as Sutton captain for the 2016–17 season, Collins scored his first goal in the National League when he headed in a corner in a 3–1 victory against Lincoln City at Sincil Bank on 13 August 2016, helping Sutton to earn their first win in English football's fifth tier in 16 years. Sutton supporters unofficially voted Collins player of the month for September 2016 and again (now officially as a re-instituted award) for October 2016.

Collins made his 100th career appearance for Sutton on 3 December 2016 in a 2–1 win against League Two club Cheltenham Town in the 2nd round of the FA Cup. In the 4th round on 29 January 2017, Collins scored a calmly taken penalty to knock out Championship side Leeds United 1–0 and send Sutton through to the 5th round for the first time in the club's 118-year history. On 20 February, Collins captained Sutton when they were defeated 0–2 by Premier League team Arsenal. He finished the season with a tally of eight goals in the league and was named Club Player of the Year.

Collins scored his first goal in Sutton's 2017–18 campaign in their opening match, a 2–0 win against Leyton Orient, going on to lead Sutton to a best ever league finish of third in England's fifth tier and a playoff semi-final. The following season, Collins was captain as Sutton became the first English team to win a match in the Scottish Challenge Cup. He retired from professional football in early 2020 to serve as a coach/assistant manager under Matt Gray. In 2020-21, Collins was part of Gray's managerial team as Sutton won the National League and promotion to the Football League for the first time in the club's 123-year history. In June 2021 however, Collins stepped down from his coaching role.

Coaching career
In June 2021, Collins came out of retirement to return to former club Havant & Waterlooville in a player-coach role, teaming up with his former Sutton manager Paul Doswell. 

Following Paul Doswell's move to Director of Football, Collins was appointed manager on 10 March 2023.

Personal life
Before signing a professional contract with Aldershot, Collins worked as a primary school teacher. He has also worked as a football coach, and received an FA level 3 coaching badge during his time at Watford.<ref name = "Aldershot Town profile

Career statistics

Honours
Sutton United
National League South: 2015–16

References

External links

1984 births
Living people
Footballers from Barking, London
English footballers
Association football midfielders
Watford F.C. players
Havant & Waterlooville F.C. players
Hampton & Richmond Borough F.C. players
Newport County A.F.C. players
Aldershot Town F.C. players
Forest Green Rovers F.C. players
Eastleigh F.C. players
Sutton United F.C. players
National League (English football) players
English Football League players
English football managers
Havant & Waterlooville F.C. managers
National League (English football) managers